A heavy machine gun (HMG) is significantly larger than light, medium or general-purpose machine guns. HMGs are typically too heavy to be man-portable (carried by one person) and require mounting onto a weapons platform to be operably stable or tactically mobile, have more formidable firepower, and generally require a team of personnel for operation and maintenance.

There are two generally recognized classes of weapons identified as HMGs. The first are weapons from  World War I identified as "heavy" due to the weight and cumbersomeness of the weapons themselves, which prevents infantrymen from transporting on foot, such as the M1917 Browning machine gun. The second are large-caliber (12.7×99mm, 12.7×108mm, 14.5×114mm, or larger) machine guns, pioneered by John Browning with the M2 machine gun, designed to provide increased effective range, penetration and destructive power against covers, vehicles, aircraft and light buildings/fortifications beyond the standard-caliber rifle cartridges used in battle rifles and medium or general-purpose machine guns, or the intermediate cartridges used in assault rifles, light machine guns, and squad automatic weapons. HMGs also have more felt recoil, compared to light and medium machine gun variants.

Classification 
The term was originally used to refer to the generation of machine guns which came into widespread use in World War I. These fired standard rifle cartridges such as the 7.92×57mm Mauser, .303 British or 7.62×54mmR, but featured heavy construction, elaborate mountings, and water-cooling mechanisms that enabled long-range sustained automatic fire with excellent accuracy. However, these advantages came at the cost of being too cumbersome to move quickly, as well as requiring a crew of several soldiers to operate them. Thus, in this sense, the "heavy" aspect of the weapon referred to the weapon's bulk and ability to sustain fire, not the cartridge caliber. This class of weapons was best exemplified by the Maxim gun, invented by the American inventor Hiram Maxim. The Maxim was the most ubiquitous machine gun of World War I, variants of which were fielded simultaneously by three separate warring nations (Germany with the MG 08, Britain with the Vickers, and Russia with the PM M1910).

The modern definition refers to a class of large-caliber (generally .50 or 12.7mm) machine guns, pioneered by John Moses Browning with the M2 machine gun. These weapons are designed to provide increased range, penetration and destructive power against vehicles, buildings, aircraft and light fortifications beyond the standard rifle calibers used in medium or general-purpose machine gun, or the intermediate cartridges used in light machine guns. In this sense, the "heavy" aspect of the weapon refers to its superior power and range over light- and medium-caliber weapons, in addition to its weight. This class of machine gun came into widespread use during World War II, when the M2 was used widely in fortifications, on vehicles and in aircraft by American forces. A similar HMG capacity was later fielded by the Soviets in the form of Vasily Degtyaryov's DShK in 12.7×108mm. The ubiquitous German MG42 general-purpose machine gun, though well-suited against infantry, lacked the M2's anti-fortification and anti-vehicle capability, a fact that was noted and lamented by the Germans. The continued need for a longer-range machine gun with anti-materiel capability to bridge the gap between exclusively anti-infantry weapons and exclusively anti-materiel weapons has led to the widespread adoption and modernization of the class, and most nations' armed forces are equipped with some type of HMG.

Currently, machine guns with calibers smaller than 10mm are generally considered medium or light machine guns, while those larger than 15mm are generally classified as autocannons instead of HMGs.

History 
In the late 19th century, Gatling guns and other externally powered types such as the Nordenfelt were often made in a variety of calibers, such as 0.5-inch and 1-inch. Due to their multiple barrels, overheating was not so much of an issue, but they were also quite heavy.

When Maxim developed his recoil-powered machine gun using a single barrel, his first main design weighed a modest 26 pounds (11.8 kg) and fired a .45-inch rifle-caliber bullet from a 24-inch barrel. A famous photo of Maxim showed him picking it up by its 15-pound tripod (6.8 kg) with one arm. It was similar to present-day medium machine guns, but it could not be fired for extended periods due to overheating. As a result, Maxim created a water jacket cooling system to enable it to fire for extended periods. However, this added significant weight, as did the change to more powerful rifle cartridges.

There were thus two main types of heavy, rapid-fire weapons: the manually powered, multiple-barrel machine guns and the single-barrel Maxim guns. By the end of the 19th century, many new designs such as the M1895 Colt–Browning and Hotchkiss were developed, powered by gas operation or recoil operation.  Also, rather than the heavy water jacket, new designs introduced other types of barrel cooling, such as barrel replacement, metal fins, heat sinks or some combination of these.

Designs 

Machine guns diverged into heavier and lighter designs. The later model water-cooled Maxim guns and its derivatives the MG 08 and the Vickers, as well as the American M1917 Browning machine gun, were all substantial weapons.  The .303 Vickers, for example, weighed 33 lb (15 kg) and was mounted on a tripod that brought the total weight to 50 lb (23 kg). The heavier designs could, and in some cases did, fire for days on end, mainly in fixed defensive positions to repel infantry attacks.  These machine guns were typically mounted on tripods and were water-cooled, and a well-trained crew could fire nonstop for hours, given sufficient ammunition, replacement barrels and cooling water.  Carefully positioned HMGs could stop an attacking force before they reached their objectives.

Light machine guns
However, during the same period a number of lighter and more portable air-cooled designs were developed weighing less than 30 lbs (15 kg). In World War I they were to be as important as the heavier designs, and were used to support infantry on the attack, on aircraft, and on many types of vehicles.

The lightest of the new designs were not capable of sustained automatic fire, as they did not have water jackets and were fed from comparatively small magazines. Essentially machine rifles with a bipod, weapons like the Lewis Gun, Chauchat and the Madsen were portable by one soldier, but were made for single and burst fire.

Medium models
The medium designs offered greater flexibility, either being fitted with a bipod in the light machine gun role or on a tripod or other weapon mount as medium machine guns. An example was the Hotchkiss M1909 machine gun weighing 27.6 lb (12.2 kg) fitted with a mini-tripod and using linkable 30-round ammunition strips, but there was also a belt-fed version.

This type of multipurpose machine gun would be further developed, and later given names such as "universal machine gun", and later "general-purpose machine gun", and would eventually supplant the water-cooled designs. These later designs used quick-change barrel replacement to reduce overheating, which further reduced the weapon's weight, but at the cost of increasing the soldier's load due to the extra barrels.  Some earlier designs like the Vickers had this feature, but it was mainly for barrel wear, as they normally used water cooling.  It was in the 1920s and 1930s that quick barrel replacement for cooling purposes became more popular in weapons such as the ZB vz. 30, the Bren, the MG34 and the MG42.

World War II and later
The heavier  designs continued to be used throughout World War II and into the 1960s, but were gradually phased out in favor of air-cooled designs. The mediums were now used both as medium machine guns while mounted on tripods and as light machine guns while mounted on bipods. This was possible in part because a heavy, static MG position was not a very effective tactic in vehicle-centered warfare, and the significantly lighter air-cooled designs could nearly match the capabilities of the water-cooled versions.

Gatling-type machine guns such as the Minigun and GShG-7.62 reappeared after World War II.  These are typically mounted on ships and helicopters because of their weight and large ammunition requirements (due to their extremely high rate of fire.)  The need for sustained automatic fire on the ground, however, is now nearly entirely filled by air-cooled medium machine guns.

See also
 Squad automatic weapon
 List of firearms
 List of machine guns
 List of multiple barrel machine guns

References

External links

Heavy Machine Guns at World Guns
Heavy Machine Guns used in WWI and WWII